The 1998 England Monarchs season was the sixth and final year of competition for the franchise in the NFL Europe League (NFLEL). The team was led by head coach Lionel Taylor in his third year, and played its home games at three different stadia across England — Crystal Palace in south London, Ashton Gate in Bristol, and Alexander Stadium in Birmingham. They finished the regular season in fifth place with a record of three wins and seven losses.

Schedule

Personnel

Staff

Roster

Standings

References

London Monarchs seasons